The Beijing–Shanghai Expressway designated as G2 and commonly abbreviated as Jinghu Expressway is a major expressway of China, linking the capital Beijing in the north to Shanghai on the central coast. It extends 1262 kilometres in length, and was finished in 2006.

The expressway's name, Jinghu, is a combination of the two cities' one-character Chinese abbreviations: Jing stands for Beijing, while Hu stands for Shanghai. The trip from Beijing to Shanghai by automobile takes about ten hours to complete with multiple drivers taking shifts and under good road conditions.

Route

The expressway passes the following major cities:
 Beijing
 Langfang, Hebei
 Tianjin
 Cangzhou, Hebei
 Dezhou, Shandong
 Jinan, Shandong
 Laiwu, Shandong
 Linyi, Shandong
 Huaian, Jiangsu
 Yangzhou, Jiangsu
 Taizhou, Jiangsu
 Wuxi, Jiangsu
 Suzhou, Jiangsu
 Shanghai

Interchanges

See also
 Jiangyin Suspension Bridge over the Yangtze River

References

Videos

Expressways in Beijing
Expressways in Tianjin
Expressways in Shanghai
Expressways in Jiangsu
Expressways in Hebei
Expressways in Shandong
02